Dirty Fingers is the third solo studio album by Northern Irish guitarist Gary Moore. It was originally recorded in 1980, but was ultimately shelved in favour of the more "radio-oriented" G-Force album. Three of the tracks ("Nuclear Attack", "Don't Let Me Be Misunderstood" and "Run to Your Mama") were later released as an EP in 1981. The album was eventually released in Japan in 1983 by Jet Records, before an international release the following year.

Track listing

The sixth song, Nuclear Attack, was also recorded as the first song on Greg Lake's debut album, with Moore playing lead guitar.

Personnel
Gary Moore – guitar, co-lead vocals on track 10, backing vocals
Charlie Huhn – lead vocals
Jimmy Bain – bass
Don Airey – organ, keyboards
Tommy Aldridge – drums

Production
Chris Tsangarides – producer, engineer
Kerusher Joule – design
The Folkestone Finger – artwork
Inky – artwork

References

1983 albums
Albums produced by Chris Tsangarides
Gary Moore albums
Jet Records albums